Catherine Lee or Lee Jih-chu (born 22 April 1960) is a Taiwanese economist and politician. She chaired the National Youth Commission from 1998 to 2000. After steeping down, Lee taught at National Chengchi University. Between 2005 and 2008, she was a member of the Legislative Yuan. Later that year, Lee became vice chairwoman of the Financial Supervisory Commission, where she served until 2013. Since leaving the central government, Lee has led the Bank of Taiwan and its parent company Taiwan Financial Holdings Group. In 2016, Lee was named vice chairwoman of Shin Kong Financial Holding Co., Ltd., a division of the Shin Kong Group.

Education
Lee earned a doctorate in economics from National Taiwan University.

Career
Lee led the National Youth Commission from 1998 to 2000. Upon stepping down, she joined the faculty of National Chengchi University, where she taught finance and economics. Lee placed third on the Kuomintang party list and was elected as an at-large legislator via proportional representation in December 2004. In August 2005, she was elected to the KMT Central Committee. Lee contested a second central committee election in 2006, and won. Lee received early support from a coalition of civic groups and retained her legislative seat in 2008, again via proportional representation. Later that year, Lee left the Legislative Yuan and was appointed vice chairperson of the Financial Supervisory Commission. In May 2010, it was reported that Lee would be reassigned to a state-owned enterprise, but she remained at the FSC and was reappointed to another term as vice chair in June 2012. Lee left the FSC in February 2013, assuming the leadership of the Chunghwa Post. Six months later, the Ministry of Finance named Lee chairperson of Taiwan Financial Holdings Group. By 2014, Lee was concurrently serving as leader of the Bankers’ Association of the Republic of China. In August 2016, Lee was named president of Shin Kong Financial Holding Co., Ltd., and won election to its board of directors in June 2017.

References

1960 births
Living people
20th-century Taiwanese economists
National Taiwan University alumni
Academic staff of the National Chengchi University
Women government ministers of Taiwan
Members of the 6th Legislative Yuan
Members of the 7th Legislative Yuan
Party List Members of the Legislative Yuan
Kuomintang Members of the Legislative Yuan in Taiwan
Politicians of the Republic of China on Taiwan from Yilan County, Taiwan
21st-century Taiwanese economists
Taiwanese business executives
Taiwanese women economists
Taiwanese women business executives
Fulbright alumni